Patrick George Hentgen (born November 13, 1968) is an American former professional baseball pitcher, and currently a special assistant with the Toronto Blue Jays organization. He played in Major League Baseball (MLB) for the Blue Jays, St. Louis Cardinals, and Baltimore Orioles from 1991 to 2004. In 1996, he won the American League (AL) Cy Young Award.

Early life
Hentgen was born in Detroit, Michigan, in 1968. He attended Fraser High School in Fraser, Michigan, and was drafted by the Toronto Blue Jays in the fifth round of the 1986 Major League Baseball draft. He signed with the Blue Jays in June 1986.

Professional baseball career
Hentgen pitched in the minor leagues from 1986 to 1990. He then split the 1991 and 1992 seasons with the Syracuse Chiefs of the International League and the Toronto Blue Jays. He made his major league debut with the Blue Jays in September 1991.

Hentgen spent the 1993 season with Toronto. He was an All-Star and finished the year with a 19–9 win–loss record and a 3.87 earned run average. He won his only start in the 1993 World Series and helped the Blue Jays win the championship. The following season, Hentgen was an All-Star again and went 13–8 with a 3.40 ERA. In 1995, he pitched poorly, going 10–14 with a 5.11 ERA and leading the AL with 236 hits allowed and 114 earned runs allowed.

In 1996, Hentgen went 8–6 before the All-Star break and then went 12–4 after the All-Star break. He won back-to-back AL pitcher of the month awards in July and August. Hentgen finished the season with a 20–10 win–loss record and a 3.22 ERA, ranking second in the AL in wins and ERA. He led the league with 265.2 innings pitched, 10 complete games, and 3 shutouts. For his efforts, he won the AL Cy Young Award, the first in Blue Jays franchise history.

The following year, Hentgen was an All-Star for the third and final time. He went 15–10 with a 3.68 ERA and led the AL with 264 innings pitched, 9 complete games, and 3 shutouts. In 1998, he went 12–11 with a 5.17 ERA. In 1999, he went 11–12 with a 4.79 ERA.

In November 1999, the Blue Jays traded Hentgen to the St. Louis Cardinals. He spent the 2000 season with the Cardinals, going 15–12 with a 4.72 ERA. In December 2000, Hentgen signed as a free agent with the Baltimore Orioles. In 2001, he went 2–3 with a 3.47 ERA and had Tommy John surgery in August. He went 0–4 with a 7.77 ERA in 2002 and 7–8 with a 4.09 ERA in 2003.

Hentgen signed as a free agent with the Blue Jays in November 2003. In 2004, he went 2–9 with a 6.95 ERA and then announced his retirement in July. Hentgen finished his MLB career with a 131–112 record, a 4.32 ERA, and 1,290 strikeouts in 2,075.1 innings pitched.

Post-playing career
Hentgen rejoined the Toronto Blue Jays under new manager John Farrell as their new bullpen coach for the 2011 season. It was Hentgen's first coaching assignment. He stepped down in November 2011 due to family reasons, and was given the title of Special Assistant to the Organization. On December 10, 2012, Hentgen was again appointed as the Blue Jays bullpen coach.

On January 4, 2014, the Blue Jays announced that Bob Stanley would be replacing Hentgen as their bullpen coach. Hentgen continued to work with the Blue Jays, as a special assistant to the organization.

Hentgen was named to the Canadian Baseball Hall of Fame in the Class of 2016.

References

External links
, or Retrosheet
Pelota Binaria (Venezuelan Winter League)

1968 births
Living people
Aberdeen IronBirds players
American expatriate baseball players in Canada
American League All-Stars
Baltimore Orioles players
Baseball players from Detroit
Bowie Baysox players
Canadian Baseball Hall of Fame inductees
Cardenales de Lara players
American expatriate baseball players in Venezuela
Cy Young Award winners
Delmarva Shorebirds players
Dunedin Blue Jays players
Frederick Keys players
Gulf Coast Orioles players
Knoxville Blue Jays players
Major League Baseball bullpen coaches
Major League Baseball pitchers
Myrtle Beach Blue Jays players
People from Fraser, Michigan
St. Catharines Blue Jays players
St. Louis Cardinals players
Sportspeople from Metro Detroit
Syracuse Chiefs players
Toronto Blue Jays coaches
Toronto Blue Jays players